Pietro Oliver Giachino (born 26 February 1995) is a Norwegian gymnast of Italian origin.

Pietro was born in Oslo to a Norwegian mother and Italian father. He has been competing in artistic gymnastics since 2006 and joined the Norwegian national team in 2007. Pietro achieved success as a member of the club, winning medals as a junior and, later, senior competitor.

The young gymnast participated in the 2014 World Artistic Gymnastics Championships. He was later given the opportunity to compete for an Italian club, Juventus (not to be confused with the football team), (February–March 2015) and participate in three sporting events. He took part in the first European Games in June. Pietro also participated in the 2015 Championships in Glasgow.

Gabriel Negru, coach of the Norwegian national team, believes that "Pietro has got a body suitable for gymnastics and is very ambitious". Former gymnast and current mentor of Pietro in Njård Espen Jansen claims that he has got advantages which could lead him to new highs. Flemming Solberg, a noticeable gymnast, gives Pietro the following description: "Pietro is a typical all-rounder, one among the greatest talents I have come across in this country. His strength is in his lean lines. He is a stylish gymnast...". Pietro himself is convinced that he will participate in the world's grand competition, and it is just a matter of time.

Trivia
Pietro is inspired by Åge Storhaug who competed from the late 1960s to the early 1970s. He speaks Norwegian, Italian and English.

References

External links
 
 

1995 births
Living people
Sportspeople from Oslo
Norwegian people of Italian descent
Norwegian male artistic gymnasts
European Games competitors for Norway
Gymnasts at the 2015 European Games
Gymnasts at the 2019 European Games